Sándor Toldi (26 January 1893 – 2 January 1955), aka Nagy, was a Hungarian track and field athlete who competed in the 1924 Summer Olympics. He was born in Pápa and died in Győr. In 1924 he was eliminated in the qualification of the discus throw competition and finished ninth overall.

References

External links
profile

1893 births
1955 deaths
Hungarian male discus throwers
Olympic athletes of Hungary
Athletes (track and field) at the 1924 Summer Olympics
People from Pápa
Sportspeople from Veszprém County